Walk on the Wild Side: The Best of Lou Reed is the first greatest hits compilation by Lou Reed, formerly of The Velvet Underground. It was issued by RCA Records  after Reed's first contract with them ended in 1976. Issued on compact disc on October 25, 1990, the album cover features photos by Mick Rock of Reed and then-girlfriend Rachel Humphreys.

Critical reception

William Ruhlmann of AllMusic writes, "Reed has been a prolific artist, and this album captures only a fraction of his catalog, but he is actually less eclectic as a rule than this collection makes him seem, so the result is an excellent introduction."

Track listing

Track information and credits adapted from the album's liner notes.

References

Lou Reed compilation albums
1977 greatest hits albums
RCA Records compilation albums